Dane Sharp may refer to:

 Dane Sharp (singer-songwriter), Australian singer-songwriter
 Dane Sharp (squash player) (born 1985), Canadian squash player